Imago Scientific Instruments  was a company founded in 1999    by Dr. Tom Kelly.  At that time he was the Director of the Materials Science Center at the University of Wisconsin–Madison, but left his tenured position in 2001 to guide the company's growth.

Imago commercialized the Local Electrode Atom Probe (LEAP), providing a new type of atom probe microscope which is literally orders of magnitude faster in many performance criteria than any other recently delivered atom probe microscope.  Imago (name comes from the Latin word for image or picture) has not only improved the instrumentation available for atom probe tomography, but has also developed many sample preparation techniques that are key enablers for the 3D sub-nanometer compositional information that the microscope provides.

In April 2010 Imago was purchased by Ametek [AME-NYSE], which is also the parent of CAMECA.  The company was merged with CAMECA as part of Ametek's Materials Analysis Division.

References

External links
For a recent review of atom probe tomography applications, see Microscopy and Microanalysis Volume 13 (2007)
CAMECA website
atomprobe.com is the CAMECA sponsored site for all users of atom probe tomography

Technology companies established in 1999
1999 establishments in Wisconsin